Levente Bősz (born 6 May 1994) is a Hungarian professional footballer who plays as a goalkeeper.

Club career
In November 2020, Bősz joined Politehnica Iași in Romania.

On 21 July 2021, Bősz moved to Mezőkövesd.

Honours
Újpest
Hungarian Cup: 2013–14

References

External links
 
 

1994 births
Living people
Footballers from Budapest
Hungarian footballers
Association football goalkeepers
Újpest FC players
Diósgyőri VTK players
BSV Schwarz-Weiß Rehden players
Dunaújváros PASE players
Vasas SC players
FC Politehnica Iași (2010) players
Mezőkövesdi SE footballers
Regionalliga players
Nemzeti Bajnokság II players
Nemzeti Bajnokság III players
Liga I players
Hungarian expatriate footballers
Hungarian expatriate sportspeople in Germany
Expatriate footballers in Germany
Hungarian expatriate sportspeople in Romania
Expatriate footballers in Romania